Anthony Buzzard may refer to:

Sir Anthony Buzzard, 2nd Baronet
Sir Anthony Buzzard, 3rd Baronet

See also
Buzzard (disambiguation)